Socialist Studies/Études socialistes is a peer-reviewed academic journal published by the Society for Socialist Studies. Its articles take a critical look at and offer solutions to various forms of social, economic, and political injustice.

Socialist Studies/Études socialistes was established in 2005 and in fall 2008 it became an online, open access e-journal. The current issue and all back issues are available online.

The 2011 issue was a special double-edition entitled "Organizing for Austerity: The Neoliberal State, Regulating Labour, and Working Class Resistance," guest edited by Bryan Evans and Ian Hussey. The most recent is an issue on pacification.

In a January 2014 review of Socialist Studies, Harvard University said "...the content spans many subjects (and) much of the content will be of special interest to a Canadian scholarly audience. Libraries serving Canadian and socialist scholars should be knowledgeable about this title."

External links

References

Publications established in 2005
Political science journals
Multilingual journals